Many countries have or have had an Atomic Energy Commission. These include:
 National Atomic Energy Commission, Argentina (1950–present)
 Australian Atomic Energy Commission (1952–1987)
 Bangladesh Atomic Energy Commission (1973–present)
 Commissariat à l'énergie atomique et aux énergies alternatives, France (1945–present)
 Atomic Energy Commission of India (1948–present)
 Japanese Atomic Energy Commission (原子力委員会) (1955–present)
 Pakistan Atomic Energy Commission (1956–present)
 United Nations Atomic Energy Commission (1946–1948)
 United States Atomic Energy Commission (1946–1975)

See also
 Atomic Energy Council, Republic of China (1955–present)
 United Kingdom Atomic Energy Authority (1954–present)